The 2023 Dr McKenna Cup, known for sponsorship reasons as the Bank of Ireland Dr McKenna Cup, was a Gaelic football competition in the province of Ulster for county teams. It took place in January 2023. The group draw took place on 13 December 2022 in Cookstown.

Competition format
Group stage

The nine teams are drawn into three sections of three teams. Each team plays the other teams in their section once, either home or away. Two points are awarded for a win and one for a draw. The points ratio method (points for divided by points against) is used to determine the ranking of teams who are level on section points (as opposed to the more typical scoring differential).

Knockout stage

The winners of the three sections and the best of the runners-up in the three sections compete in the semi-finals with the two winners meeting in the final. Drawn games go to penalty shootouts without extra time being played.

Group stage

Section A

Section B

Section C

Ranking of section runners-up

Knock-out stage

Semi-finals

Final

References

McKenna Cup
Dr McKenna Cup